This is a list of events in Scottish television from 1958.

Events
7 May - First broadcast of the BBC variety show The White Heather Club, which aired until 1968.

Debuts

BBC
7 May - The White Heather Club (1958–1968)

Television programmes
Scotsport (1957–2008)

Births
2 August - Elaine C. Smith, actress and comedian
30 November - Gary Lewis, actor
Unknown - Alastair Duncan, actor
Unknown - Rob MacLean, television presenter

See also
1958 in Scotland

References

 
Television in Scotland by year
1950s in Scottish television